Lorenzo Ahmed González Cacho (November 29, 2001 – March 9, 2010) was an eight-year-old Puerto Rican boy who was murdered in his home in Dorado, Puerto Rico, on March 9, 2010. At the time of his death, his mother, Ana Cacho, and two sisters were at the house.

The case has gained notoriety in the island for the discrepancies and irregularities surrounding the evidence and testimonies about it, which initially led to the boy's mother along with three males to be labeled potential suspects by the island's Secretary of Justice at the time Guillermo Somoza. However, on March 9, 2015, on the 5th anniversary of the murder, the Puerto Rico Justice Department announced that the mother along with the three men, were no longer suspects.

The Department of Justice confirmed on March 7, 2016, that charges be filed for the crime of first degree murder against Luis Gustavo Rivera Seijo, better known as "El Manco", for the child's death. On April 28, 2016, charges against Rivera Seijo were dropped due to total lack of evidence (DNA, fingerprints, etc.) that could prove the presence of Rivera Seijo in Cacho's residence. On June 7, 2016, in a trial on appeal, the charges against Rivera Seijo were dropped again due to total lack of evidence (DNA, fingerprints, etc.) that could prove the presence of Rivera Seijo in Cacho's residence.

Background
Lorenzo González Cacho was born on November 29, 2001. He was the  middle child of Ahmed Alí González and Ana Cacho out of three. The couple also had two daughters. From an early age, González showed interest in sports, and was active in a soccer team. He was studying at Dorado Academy in his hometown. At the time of Lorenzo's death, his parents were in the process of divorcing. Also, at that time, his sisters were approximately 13 and 5 years old.

Death
On March 9, 2010, Ana Cacho took Lorenzo to the Treatment and Diagnostic Center in Dorado, Puerto Rico. Cacho arrived between 5:00 and 5:30 am with Lorenzo covered in blood. The child was pronounced dead at the clinic. Upon questioning, Cacho claimed that her son had fallen from his bed at their home in Dorado del Mar. However, this version was discarded by the autopsy which revealed severe injuries to the face and head, which included three stabbing wounds to the face.

Suspects
Although no charges have been filed, the Puerto Rico Department of Justice had identified four people considered suspects in the death of Lorenzo. However, on March 9, 2015, on the 5th anniversary of the murder, the Puerto Rico Department of Justice announced that all four were no longer suspects.

Ana I. Cacho González – Lorenzo's mother. She was identified as a suspect by the Department of Justice on March 19, 2010. Her two daughters were also removed from her home on March 30, 2010, and they haven't had contact since. Through the process, Cacho has insisted that she is innocent.  On March 9, 2015, on the 5th anniversary of the murder, the Puerto Rico Department of Justice announced that she was no longer a suspect.
Jesús Jenaro Camacho – Cacho's boyfriend at the time of the murder. He was identified as a suspect on October 26, 2011. He denies being in the house when the incident occurred. He has also maintained that he is innocent. On March 9, 2015, on the 5th anniversary of the murder, the Puerto Rico Department of Justice announced that he was no longer a suspect.
Arnaldo "Naldy" Colón – A friend of Cacho. It has been rumored he was at the house the night of the murder. On March 9, 2015, on the 5th anniversary of the murder, the Puerto Rico Department of Justice announced that he was no longer a suspect.
William Marrero Rivera – Federal agent working for the U.S. Immigration and Customs Enforcement (ICE). He was identified as a suspect in August 2012 by the authorities. Allegedly he was also present in Cacho's house the night of the murder. On March 9, 2015, on the 5th anniversary of the murder, the Puerto Rico Department of Justice announced that he was no longer a suspect.
Luis Gustavo Rivera Seijo – better known as "El Manco", a homeless man missing his left forearm, who grew up in the same neighborhood and was incorrectly released from jail the night of the murder was also previously identified as a suspect, allegedly Rivera Seijo confessed to the crime, but the authorities discarded his involvement due to lack of evidence confirming his admission. He was previously diagnosed with a mental disorder.
On March 8, 2016, the Judge Jessica Morales, determined probable cause for arrest for murder against Luis Gustavo Rivera Seijo aka "El Manco" for Lorenzo González Cacho's death. Charges of Negligence, justice obstruction and suspicion of murder for the previously accused had been retired due to a total lack of forensic evidence to even confirm the presence of Rivera Seijo at the crime scene.

Controversy
The case gained widespread notoriety throughout the island when the gossip-news show SuperXclusivo, started following it closely. While following the case, a number of irregularities were alleged. Among these is the crime scene, which was not secured and was cleaned after it had already been seen by investigators, but before forensics could thoroughly analyze it.
Ana Cacho's father met with the governor at the time, Luis Fortuño, and handed him a mysterious envelope.
The secretary of Justice at the time, Antonio Sagardía, resigned to his post and became Ana Cacho's lawyer, and expressed that she was a victim of the media, although this was seen as unethical by many. Of the other three previous suspects, only Jenaro Camacho has given a public interview.

"El Manco" who was accused of the murder in March 2016, was shown to have been diagnosed with mental problems. He had confessed at the beginning of the investigation and several other times, sometimes retracting his confessions. His confessions weren't considered valid at first, because according to authorities they didn't add up and the claimed murder weapon was never found. Some believe him to have confessed because he prefers jail to being homeless. On April 28, 2016, another Judge explained the confession was full of errors and that there is no evidence (DNA, fingerprints, etc.) that could prove the presence of "El Manco" in Cacho's residence.

See also 
Death of Caylee Anthony, 2-year-old American child whose mother was accused of her murder
Death of Liliana Barbarita Cepeda
List of unsolved murders

References

2001 births
2010 deaths
2010 in Puerto Rico
2010 murders in Puerto Rico
Deaths by person in Puerto Rico
Incidents of violence against boys
Male murder victims
March 2010 crimes
Murdered Puerto Rican children
People murdered in Puerto Rico
Unsolved murders in Puerto Rico